The Victorian Close Championship was an annual golf tournament held in Victoria, Australia. It was founded in 1948. It was superseded by the Victorian Open which was first held in 1957, but was reintroduced the following year and continued until about 1978.

History
A 36-hole close championship was planned for 1939 but was cancelled because of the war. The Victorian Golf Association revived the idea in 1947 as a 36-hole "open scratch event", open to amateurs and professionals resident in Victoria, played on a single day at Victoria Golf Club. Professional George Naismith and amateur Bill Higgins tied with scores of 149.

The first Close Championship was played at Huntingdale in 1948 and was won by Ossie Pickworth who finished 12 strokes ahead of the field. Pickworth won again in 1950, 1954 and 1955, each time by large margins. 19-year-old Peter Thomson won in 1949 and he won again in 1951, each time by 8 strokes. Jack Harris won in 1952 while Tom Crow was the first amateur winner in 1953.

The Victorian Open started in 1957, replacing the Close championship. However the Close Championship was reintroduced in 1958, with the event to be played outside Melbourne. The 1958 event was played over 72 holes but from 1959 it became a 54-hole event. Bruce Devlin, still an amateur, won in 1959. The tournament existed through the 1970s. In 1976, Mike Cahill, who recently turned professional, won the event. The championship was finally dropped in 1978.

Winners

This list in incomplete

References

Golf tournaments in Australia
Golf in Victoria (Australia)
Recurring sporting events established in 1948
1948 establishments in Australia